Mieczysław Klimowicz (December 14, 1919, Sokal – August 26, 2008 Wrocław) was a Polish World War II historian,  statesman (Sejm deputy, 1972–1976), World War II fighter, and rector of the University of Wrocław (1987–1990).

His main interests include the history of Polish literature and theatre of the Age of Enlightenment.

Major books
1953: Prekursorzy Oświecenia (with Roman Kaleta).  Ossolineum Publishing House
1965: Początki teatru stanisławowskiego (1965). Państwowy Inst. Wydawniczy. 
1988: Literatura Oświecenia

Awards
Knight's and Officer's crosses of the Order of Polonia Restituta
Silver Cross of Merit (Poland)
Knight's and Officer's crosses of the Ordre des Palmes Académiques, France

References

1919 births
2008 deaths
20th-century Polish historians
Polish male non-fiction writers
Members of the Polish Sejm 1972–1976
Academic staff of the University of Wrocław